Paul F. Jones (1909–1960) was the first African-American elected to Pittsburgh, Pennsylvania's City Council in 1954.  He was born in Kentucky in 1909, and moved to Pittsburgh at the age of 11.  He graduated from Duquesne Law School and served in World War II. His first public service was in the State House, where he held one of Allegheny County's allotted at-large seats.  He was Chair of the Urban Renewal Committee, which played a significant role in the redevelopment of the lower Hill District. He was also active in the NAACP, Urban League, American Legion and VFW. He died in office in July 1960.

References

External links
Pittsburghers of the Century
 Chris Potter in the Pittsburgh City Paper, 2005-09-14/2005-09-21 edition, page 15, "You Had To Ask".

Pennsylvania city council members
Members of the Pennsylvania House of Representatives
African-American city council members in Pennsylvania
African-American state legislators in Pennsylvania
Year of birth uncertain
1960 deaths
1909 births
20th-century American politicians
20th-century African-American politicians